William Bergsma's Violin Concerto is a composition for Violin and Orchestra completed in 1965.

Structure 
The composition is in three movements:

Moderato pesante
Poco adagio
Allegro ostinato

A typical performance takes around 22 minutes

Performance history 
Broeker noted that the first performance took place on 18 May 1966. Further performances by other university orchestras followed in 1968  and 1969 .

The first and to date only recording  was released by Vox Turnabout in 1971 paired with Morton Subotnick's "Laminations" and John Eaton's "Concert Piece for Synket and Orchestra".

References

Notes

Sources 

Compositions by William Bergsma
Bergsma
1965 compositions
20th-century classical music